is a slang term in the Japanese language for playfully sexual actions. As an adjective, it is used with the meaning of "sexy", "dirty" or "naughty"; as a verb,  means "to have sex", and as a noun, it is used to describe someone of lascivious behavior. It is softer than the Japanese word  ( from Eros or "erotic"), and does not imply perversion in the way hentai does.

The word ecchi has been adopted by western fans of Japanese media to describe works with sexual overtones. In western culture, it has come to be used to refer to softcore or playful sexuality, as distinct from the word hentai, which connotes perversion or fetishism. Works described as ecchi by the western fans do not show sexual intercourse or genitalia, but sexual themes are referenced. Ecchi themes are a type of fan service, and can be found in most comedy shōnen and seinen manga and harem anime.

Etymology and use in Japan 
The correct transcription of the word  in Hepburn notation is "". However, it is typically written as "ecchi" in the Western world.

In the word hentai, the first kanji  refers to strangeness or weird, and the second kanji  refers to a condition or state.  was introduced in the Meiji period as a term for change of form or transformation in science and psychology. In this context, it was used to refer to disorders such as hysteria or to describe paranormal phenomena like hypnosis or telepathy. Slowly, the meaning expanded until it had the meaning of non-standard. In the 1910s, it was used in sexology in the compound expression "" (abnormal sexual desire, which is rephrased as "sexual perversion" in modern times) and became popular within the theory of sexual deviance, published by Eiji Habuto and Jun'ichirō Sawada in 1915. In the 1920s, many publications dealt with deviant sexual desires and the  movement. Goichi Matsuzawa calls it a period characterized by a "hentai boom". In the 1930s, censorship became more common, leading to fewer books being published on this theme.

After the Second World War, in the 1950s, interest in hentai was renewed, and people would sometimes refer to it just by the first English letter, H (pronounced as). In 1952, the magazine Shukan Asahi reported that a woman who was groped by a stranger in a movie theater reacted with "" ("hey, that's perverse"). From this, the word  started to branch off, and assume new connotations. In the 1960s,  started to be used by youth to refer to sex in general. By the 1980s, it was used to mean sex, as in the phrase  (to have sex).

Ecchi is now used as a qualifier for anything related to erotic or pornographic content. Its exact meaning varies with context, but in general, it is most similar to the English word "naughty" (when used as an adjective). The Japanese media tend to use other words, e.g. ero-manga, adult manga, or anime / manga for persons over 18 years. The prefix "H-" is also sometimes used to refer to pornographic genres, e.g. H-anime, H-manga, etc.

Western usage 
In Japan, oiroke manga (お色気漫画) is used to describe manga with very light or playful erotic content, such as is found in shonen manga. In western nations, though, ecchi has become the preferred term. The more explicit  manga are more likely to be referred to as hentai in the west. This does correlate to a similar distinction in Japanese. For instance, if a young woman were to call a young man , that might be construed as flirting, whereas  sounds more like condemnation.

Works aimed at a female audience can contain scenes which are seen as ecchi.

Common elements of ecchi include conversations with sexual references or misunderstandings (e.g. double entendre or innuendo), misunderstandings in visual depictions (e.g. suggestive posing), revealing or sexualized clothing (e.g. underwear or cosplay), nudity (e.g. ripped apart clothing, wet clothing, clothing malfunctions) and the portrayal of certain actions (e.g. groping). This kind of sexuality is often used for comical effect. A typical example scene would contain a male protagonist that trips over a female character, giving the impression of sexual harassment.

The concept of ecchi is very closely related to fan service. While fan service describes every aspect to please the fans, ecchi relates to sexual themes. A special kind of fan service, that is usually bound or justified by the narrative.

Typical examples 

There are many elements that may classify a work as ecchi, but these elements have to occur quite often (for example, in all episodes of a show). Graphically speaking, different techniques are used to show sexy pictures, usually by revealing parts of the female body such as the back or breasts. Some of these patterns are recurrent, such as scenes in a shower, hot springs (onsen), or fighting scenes in which clothes are torn apart. The imagination of characters is also a common device for showing their sexual fantasies, as well as transformation scenes of magical girls. In the end, any excuse is valid to show a character partially or completely nude.

Nudity 

Levels of nudity vary strongly between works, depending on the intended audience and the preferences of the authors. For example, in some cases, though the breasts are shown on the screen, nipples and genitals are obscured by props, clothing, or effects. This kind of censorship was typical for Lala Satalin Deviluke in To Love Ru, Blair in Soul Eater and Asuka Langley Soryu from Neon Genesis Evangelion. Meanwhile, in Ladies versus Butlers! and other anime, the nipples are clearly visible through clothing, no matter how thick it is. Nosebleeds are a typical reaction to nudity in Japanese works, as they represent sexual arousal; this is due to an exaggeration of high blood pressure whilst aroused.

Panties 

The use of panty shots (panchira), or visibility of the underwear (panties), is one common motif. Typically, the male will react in an exaggerated manner and be castigated. The color and style of the panties are seen as an indication of the female's character, e.g. white for innocent characters, striped for shy characters, and red for sexually aggressive characters. Panties are a popular main theme in ecchi (for instance, Chobits and Panty & Stocking with Garterbelt), but they are also featured in other shows just for sexual appeal.

Sexual activity 
Although revealing or sexualized clothing, nudity or groping may occur in ecchi works, there usually is no explicit sexual intercourse in the works; in the west, such works are classified as hentai. However, in an ecchi work, it may appear as if a couple are having sex. For instance, the two may be seen in silhouette from outside a tent, appearing to be having sex, although they are doing something nonsexual.

See also

 Adult animation
 Cartoon pornography
 Doujinshi
 Exhibitionism
 Fan service
 Hentai
 Not safe for work
 Nudity in film
 Rule 34
 Scopophilia
 Softcore porn
 Thirst trap
 Voyeurism

References 

 
Anime and manga genres
Anime and manga terminology
Japanese sex terms
Pornography